Doumea typica is a species of loach catfish found in the Dja River and coastal rivers in Cameroon, the Republic of Congo and Gabon as well as possibly in the Democratic Republic of Congo.  It reaches a length of 13.2 cm.

References 
 

Amphiliidae
Freshwater fish of Central Africa
Taxa named by Henri Émile Sauvage
Fish described in 1879